Lieutenant-Colonel Edward Gaspard Ponsonsby, 2nd Baron Sysonby  (7 June 1903 – 21 January 1956), was an officer of the British Army and a member of the House of Lords.

Family
Edward Ponsonby was born in 1903, the only surviving son of Frederick Ponsonby the first Baron, and the cookbook author Ria Sysonby (née Kennard).

The Ponsonby family has played a leading role in British life for two centuries. In addition to his father's role as trusted adviser to three British monarchs, his grandfather was the Sir Henry Ponsonby – memorably played by Geoffrey Palmer in the film Mrs Brown – who was Private Secretary to Queen Victoria. His great-grandfather was badly wounded at the Battle of Waterloo, but survived to become General Sir Frederick Ponsonby. The sister who helped nurse him back to health was Lady Caroline, better known to history under her married name of Lady Caroline Lamb as the wife of the future Prime Minister Lord Melbourne and lover of the poet Lord Byron. Lady Caroline was also a key figure in the film Lady Caroline Lamb – played by Sarah Miles – in 1972. The father of the two siblings, Edward's great-great-grandfather, was the 3rd Earl of Bessborough. The man wounded at Waterloo is not to be confused with another Ponsonby depicted on film, his kinsman General Sir William Ponsonby, whose death – possibly due to not risking his best horse in battle – at the hands of a group of lancers is an incident noted in the film Waterloo. Edward's sister, Loelia, married the 2nd Duke of Westminster, before remarrying, after the Second World War, to become the alliterative Lady Loelia Lindsay.

Edward Ponsonby was educated at Eton College.

Career
Edward Ponsonby's father died in the year that he was granted a peerage and Edward Ponsonby became the 2nd Lord Sysonby in 1935.

On 2 October 1936, the Lord Sysonby married Sallie Whitney Sanford, the daughter of Dr. Leonard Cutler Sanford. There were two children from the marriage. A daughter, Hon. Carolyn Ponsonby, was born in 1938, but the long absences during the war years meant that it was not until 1945 that John, the sole heir to the title, was born.

When Lord Sysonby joined the British Army, he chose the local 'County' regiment, the Queen's Royal Regiment (West Surrey), otherwise known as the West Surreys. He served initially in the Territorial Army, in the 5th Battalion, Queen's Royal Regiment, part of the 131st (Surrey) Infantry Brigade. During the Second World War, Lord Sysonby volunteered for the Commandos became a Commando officer and rose to the rank of Lieutenant-Colonel. He was decorated with the DSO in 1940 during the Battle of France and retreat to Dunkirk where he was evacuated.

In 1948, Lord Sysonby and his young family emigrated to Africa, in search of a better life than that on offer in post-war Britain. Initially they moved to what was then called Southern Rhodesia, now Zimbabwe, but were unable to find a suitable home there and stayed only two years in the country. In 1950, the family moved on to Kenya and in this colony they were able to make a home. The family settled in Kitale in the uplands of Western Kenya, in the Rift Valley region, where Lord Sysonby hoped to make a living in farming. Unfortunately, he died only a few years later.

Lord Sysonby died in Nairobi on 21 January 1956, at the age of 52, and the title passed to his only son, John Ponsonby, 3rd Baron Sysonby. Lady Sysonby died in 1977.

When John died without issue in Wonersh, Surrey, in 2009, the title became extinct.

Notes

References
 Kidd, Charles, Williamson, David (editors). Debrett's Peerage and Baronetage (1990 edition). New York: St Martin's Press, 1990, 
William M. Kuhn, ‘Ponsonby,  Frederick Edward Grey, first Baron Sysonby  (1867–1935)’, Oxford Dictionary of National Biography, Oxford University Press,  2004; online edn, Jan 2008, accessed 14 July 2011.
 
 Sir Frederick Ponsonby, Colin Welch (editor). Recollections of Three Reigns. London: Odhams, Eyre & Spottiswoode, 1951.

1903 births
1956 deaths
British Army Commandos officers
Barons in the Peerage of the United Kingdom
Companions of the Distinguished Service Order
People educated at Eton College
Queen's Royal Regiment officers
British Army personnel of World War II